Petros Konteon (born 9 May 1984) is a Greek footballer who plays for Iraklis in the Gamma Ethniki. He started his career with PAOK. He also had spells with Niki Volos, Panserraikos, Diagoras, Olympiakos Volos, Pierikos, Doxa Drama and Iraklis.

Career
Konteon was brought up from PAOK's academies and started his professional career for PAOK in 2002. While in PAOK he was loaned out to Niki Volos, where he spent the 2004-2005 season. On 24 January 2006 Konteon signed for Panserraikos for 1.5 years, finally staying for a mere six months. After leaving Panserraikos he joined Diagoras for the 2006-07 season. In 2007, he signed for Olympaikos Volos from which he was released during the 2009 winter transfer window. He signed for Pierikos during the 2010 winter transfer window, where he spent 2.5 years making a total of 66 appearances for the club and scoring nine times.

In the summer of 2012 he reached an agreement with Doxa Drama with which he spent the 2012-13 season. He was released from Doxa in the summer of 2013. On 15 July 2013 he signed an annual contract with Greek Football League outfit Iraklis. He made his debut for his new club in an away 1–0 loss against Vataniakos. He managed to score his first goal for the club in a 2–1 home win against Aiginiakos. He finished the season appearing in 25 matches and scoring 1 goal. On 11 July 2014 he signed for Chania.

References

 Ακόμη τρεις προσθήκες ο Παναργειακός‚ sportaltv.gr, 16 January 2016

External links
 
 

1984 births
Living people
Greek footballers
Super League Greece players
Diagoras F.C. players
Doxa Drama F.C. players
Iraklis Thessaloniki F.C. players
Olympiacos Volos F.C. players
Panserraikos F.C. players
PAOK FC players
Pierikos F.C. players
AO Chania F.C. players
PAS Lamia 1964 players
Association football midfielders
Association football defenders
Footballers from Thessaloniki